Leon Powe Jr. (born January 22, 1984) is an American former professional basketball power forward. Drafted in 2006 by the Denver Nuggets, Powe grew up in Oakland, California, and played college basketball at the University of California, Berkeley. He played his first three years in the NBA with the Boston Celtics and won a championship with the team in 2008. From 2009 to 2011, Powe played for the Cleveland Cavaliers. He also had a stint with the Memphis Grizzlies in 2011. After a stint in Puerto Rico, Powe announced his retirement in 2014 citing multiple injuries and his desire to become a businessman.

Early life
Powe grew up in Oakland, California. His father left him when he was two years old. When he was seven years old, the family's house burned down and they were homeless for years. They moved more than twenty times within six years. He and his siblings were taken away from their mother by the state of California and put into foster care. Powe's mother died four days before he played in the state championship.

High school career
Powe attended Oakland Technical High School along with former Seattle Seahawks running back Marshawn Lynch, where he averaged 27.4 ppg, 14.2 rpg and 3.1 bpg as a senior. With Powe in the roster, Oakland Tech won the CIF Oakland Section Championship and also reached the CIF State Championships in 2002 and 2003. He was named a first-team Parade All-American and the Gatorade California Player of the Year during his senior year. A highly rated prep star, Powe was selected to play in the McDonald's All-American game and became the first Oakland Tech athlete to have his number retired by the school.

College career
Powe played college basketball for the California Golden Bears from 2003 to 2006. Although he was present for three seasons, he did not play in his sophomore year (2004–05) due to a serious knee injury. During his freshman season, he was named the Pac-10 Freshman of the Year, leading the conference in rebounding.

Questions abounded about whether Powe would return to form following his knee surgery, but he worked hard and rehabilitated to become a dominant force on the interior as he continued to improve his game. He produced 20.5 PPG and 10.1 RPG while leading Cal to a 20–11 record and a berth in the NCAA tournament.

Powe was named California's most valuable player during a banquet in April 2006. Powe, who also was selected Cal's MVP as a freshman in 2004, averaged 20.5 ppg and 10.1 rpg to become just the sixth player ever to pace the Pac-10 Conference in both categories. Named a second-team All-American by the Associated Press, the U.S. Basketball Writers and ESPN.com, he was chosen to the All-Pac-10 First Team for a second time in 2006.

Professional career
After his junior year, Powe decided to enter his name in the 2006 NBA draft. Powe was selected by the Denver Nuggets in the second round as the 49th overall pick. The Nuggets subsequently traded him to the Boston Celtics. After playing for the Celtics summer league team, Powe was signed by the team to a 3-year contract.  Although Powe did not reach the sum of 14 in his per game points, rebounds, and assists necessary to guarantee the second year of his contract, that second year became guaranteed when Boston did not waive him by July 1, 2007.  Powe had a similar hurdle of 16 for the sum of the three statistics to guarantee the third year of his contract (2008–09).

2006–07 NBA season
Powe played as a fourth string center behind Kendrick Perkins, Brian Scalabrine and Michael Olowokandi in his rookie season. After a rash of injuries submarined Boston's playoff chances, Powe received a limited opportunity to showcase his skills. He proved himself a capable defender who could alter shots and provide interior rebounding. On January 12, 2007, Powe made the most out of his 25 minutes and registered a career-high 12 rebounds against the Toronto Raptors. On April 10, 2007, he scored  19 points against the Atlanta Hawks. Powe finished the 2006–07 campaign averaging 4.2 points and 3.4 rebounds in just over 11 minutes per game.

2007–08 NBA season

On January 29, 2008, Powe had a breakout performance that took place in Miami against the Heat, as he effectively filled in the blank of the absent main contributors Kevin Garnett and Ray Allen, scoring 25 points and grabbing 11 rebounds en route to a 117–87 blowout victory. He also scored his career-high 27 points in the last game of the season against the New Jersey Nets on April 16, 2008.

One of his most notable performances of the season came in Game 2 of the 2008 NBA Finals against the Los Angeles Lakers on June 8, 2008, as he scored 21 points,  which included several dunks and 13 free throw attempts in only 15 minutes of play in front of a crowd chanting his name en route to a 108–102 Celtics victory.

2008–09 NBA season
On March 13, 2009, Powe started in place of the injured Kevin Garnett, scoring a career-high 30 points, grabbing 11 rebounds and blocking a career-high 5 shots, in a 102–92 Celtics victory over the Memphis Grizzlies.

Powe spent the end of the season attempting to recover from a right knee strain.  He returned in time for the playoffs, only to tear the ACL and meniscus in his left knee in Game 2 of the first round against the Chicago Bulls. Powe continued to play on the torn ACL for three minutes before being taken out. His season ended with the knee injury, and had successful surgery to repair the injury on May 5, 2009. On August 2, the Cleveland Cavaliers offered Powe an offer sheet worth two years and $1.8 million. On August 11, 2009, Powe and the Cavaliers agreed in principle to the deal with an option on the second year. On August 12, 2009, he officially signed the deal.

2010–11 NBA season

On February 24, 2011, Powe was waived when the Cleveland Cavaliers needed to clear their roster capacity after making two trades. He had just recovered from surgery to repair the torn meniscus in his right knee which had kept him sidelined for six weeks. Over a week later, Powe signed for the rest of the season with the Memphis Grizzlies.

Basketball post-career 
In 2014, Powe was hired by the Celtics as community ambassador.

NBA career statistics

Regular season 

|-
| align="left" | 
| align="left" | Boston
| 63 || 2 || 11.4 || .446 || .000 || .736 || 3.4 || .2 || .2 || .3 || 4.2
|-
|style="text-align:left;background:#afe6ba;"| †
| align="left" | Boston
| 56 || 5 || 14.4 || .572 || .000 || .710 || 4.1 || .3 || .3 || .3 || 7.9
|-
| align="left" | 
| align="left" | Boston
| 70 || 7 || 17.5 || .524 || .000 || .689 || 4.9 || .7 || .3 || .5 || 7.7
|-
| align="left" | 
| align="left" | Cleveland
| 20 || 2 || 11.8 || .429 || .000 || .587 || 3.0 || .0 || .3 || .1 || 4.0
|-
| align="left" | 
| align="left" | Cleveland
| 14 || 3 || 13.4 || .492 || .000 || .462 || 2.7 || .1 || .5 || .2 || 5.0
|-
| align="left" | 
| align="left" | Memphis
| 16 || 0 || 8.8 || .500 || .000 || .609 || 1.6 || .3 || .2 || .1 || 5.5
|- class="sortbottom"
| style="text-align:center;" colspan="2"| Career
| 239 || 19 || 13.9 || .515 || .000 || .682 || 3.8 || .3 || .3 || .3 || 6.2

Playoffs 

|-
|style="text-align:left;background:#afe6ba;"| 2008†
| align="left" | Boston
| 23 || 1 || 11.7 || .493 || .000 || .667 || 2.7 || .2 || .0 || .1 || 5.0
|-
| align="left" | 2009
| align="left" | Boston
| 2 || 0 || 12.0 || .429 || .000 || .667 || 4.5 || .0 || .0 || .0 || 5.0
|-
| align="left" | 2010
| align="left" | Cleveland
| 3 || 0 || 3.0 || .250 || .000 || .750 || .7 || .0 || .0 || .0 || 1.7
|-
| align="left" | 2011
| align="left" | Memphis
| 4 || 0 || 3.5 || .250 || .000 || .750 || 1.0 || .0 || .0 || .0 || 1.8
|-
|- class="sortbottom"
| style="text-align:center;" colspan="2"| Career
| 32 || 1 || 9.9 || .457 || .000 || .675 || 2.4 || .1 || .0 || .1 || 4.3

References

External links

Leon Powe Fan Site
The Making of Leon Powe
Cal Bears Profile
Draft Profile
Videos of Leon Powe on mReplay.com

1984 births
Living people
African-American basketball players
All-American college men's basketball players
American men's basketball players
Atléticos de San Germán players
Basketball players from Oakland, California
Boston Celtics players
California Golden Bears men's basketball players
Cleveland Cavaliers players
Denver Nuggets draft picks
McDonald's High School All-Americans
Memphis Grizzlies players
Parade High School All-Americans (boys' basketball)
Power forwards (basketball)
21st-century African-American sportspeople
20th-century African-American people